Honda Motor Company, Ltd. operates plants worldwide for the manufacture of their products. In a vehicle identification number (VIN), the 11th digit indicates the factory the auto has been built in.

Former plants

References

 
Honda